Darya Kustova (born 29 May 1986) is a former professional Belarusian tennis player. 

Her career-high WTA rankings are 117 in singles, which she reached in January 2010, and 66 in doubles, attained in July 2008.

Kustova won one doubles title on the WTA Tour, partnering Mariya Koryttseva, as well as seven singles and 29 doubles titles on tournaments of the ITF Circuit.

Playing for Belarus Fed Cup team, she has accumulated a win–loss record of 11–4.

Kustova retired from tour tennis before the 2013 season.

WTA career finals

Doubles: 2 (1 title, 1 runner-up)

ITF Circuit finals

Singles: 8 (7–1)

Doubles: 56 (29–27)

External links
 
 
 

1986 births
Living people
Belarusian female tennis players
Olympic tennis players of Belarus
Tennis players from Minsk
Tennis players at the 2008 Summer Olympics
21st-century Belarusian women